Ștefan Gabriel Preda (born 18 June 1970) is a retired Romanian football goalkeeper.

Preda got three caps for the national team, and was in the squad for the 1994 World Cup.

International career

International stats

Honours

Club
Petrolul Ploieşti
Cupa României: 1994–95
Supercupa României runner-up: 1995

Dinamo București
Divizia A: 1999–2000, 2003–04
Cupa României: 1999–00, 2000–01, 2003–04

External links
 
 

1970 births
Living people
Sportspeople from Ploiești
Romanian footballers
Association football goalkeepers
1994 FIFA World Cup players
Romania international footballers
FC Petrolul Ploiești players
FC Dinamo București players
FC Astra Giurgiu players
FC U Craiova 1948 players
FC Argeș Pitești players
FC Unirea Urziceni players
Liga I players